Juan Alvarado (1 December 1893 – 19 December 1969) was a Chilean footballer. He played in three matches for the Chile national football team in 1917. He was also part of Chile's squad for the 1917 South American Championship.

References

External links
 

1893 births
1969 deaths
Chilean footballers
Chile international footballers
Place of birth missing
Association football midfielders
Santiago Wanderers footballers